Prêmio ACIE de Cinema is a Brazilian film award.

The prize 
OR LICA Film Award was born in 2004. Conceived by the President of LICA, Michael Astor, a correspondent for the Associated Press, the award was inspired by the Golden Globe Awards awarded by the Hollywood Foreign Press Association (Association Foreign Press of Hollywood, in Portuguese).

In each edition, the feature films commercially released in Brazilian cinema during the previous year are assessed by the Award Committee, formed by corresponding international partners of LICA. They watch all productions and show four films in each of the nine competitive categories: film (fiction), Director, Actress, Actor, Documentary, Photography, Writing, Soundtrack and Blockbuster Brazil. This last category was created in the 2012 edition to reward films that achieved top grossing a million tickets.

All nominated films participate in a show open to the public, held at Centro Cultural Banco do Brazil (CCBB) in Rio. In addition to allowing all associated with LICA to watch movies, the show has the public vote ( not foreign correspondents) to elect the winner in the category Popular Jury.

At the opening of the show, the Prize carries out the premiere of an unpublished long in the supply chain, followed by a discussion with the director, actors and producers.

After watching the films during the show, the corresponding international affiliated with LICA vote, the internet, your favorite in each category. The winners are revealed at the awards ceremony.
The event has also a special honor, awarded by the prize to a film industry personality for lifetime achievement. The tribute began to be made from the 2007 edition.

And as the party is of international correspondents, an associate of LICA is honored by the dissemination of Brazilian culture with RioFilme Award. The winner is chosen by the very RioFilme based on materials submitted by journalists, broadcast in newspapers, magazines, TV, radio or internet, in the previous year.

The trophy
The winners of each category of Film Award LICA receive from the foreign correspondents a trophy designed by jewelry designer Antonio Bernardo. The image of the movie projection cone was the starting point for the design, made in acrylic material. The cone symbolizes the power of implementation of the spectators for the many worlds portrayed in the award-winning films.

Categories 
Best Picture: since 2004
Best Director: since 2004
Best Actress: since 2004
Best Actor: since 2004
Best Documentary: since 2004
Best Screenplay: since 2004
Best Cinematography: since 2006
Special Tribute: since 2007; highlights an individual from the Brazilian film industry
Best Soundtrack: since 2010
Blockbuster Brazil: since 2012

Winners of the Special Tribute award 
The following individuals have received Lifetime Achievement Awards, listed by year.

References

External links
 Award website

Brazilian film awards